Lakshmi Ghar Aayi is an Indian television social drama that aired from 5 July 2021 to 17 September 2021 on Star Bharat. The show dealt with the issue of dowry system still prevailing in India. Produced by Shakuntalam Telefilms, it starred Simran Pareenja, Akshit Sukhija and Ananya Khare.

Plot
The plot revolves around the life of Mathili Tiwari who becomes a victim of dowry. The story starts with the quest of Jwala Devi Kumar, Raghav Kumar's mother to find an ideal daughter-in-law who would bring all the richness to satisfy her greed. Maithili and Raghav meet each coincidentally when both are invited to the same wedding, where Jwala is also present searching for a bride for her son, Raghav. Seeing the respect and riches owned by Maithili's father, Arun Tiwari, Maithili is also chosen by Jwala to become her son, Raghav’s wife. Later in a turn of unfortunate events created by Jwala, Raghav’s saves both Maithili and her friend, Shikha, where it is revealed that both Maithili and Raghav share the same thoughts against the dowry system still prevailing in India.
 
The story progresses with another chance meeting of Maithili and Raghav where they turn into good acquaintances learning    about each other’s identity. Things take a better turn in their relationship when Maithili saves Raghav from an unnecessary misunderstanding and helps him to reach his venue of interview on time. Thus, they become friends from being acquaintances.
 
On the other side, Jwala unbeknownst to Raghav takes his alliance for Maithili to the Tiwaris house where Arun Tiwari refuses to get his daughter married as he feels she is not yet ready to marry. He strongly believes Maithili needs to first focus on her career and become an independent woman in the society. However, Jwala has set her eyes on Arun Tiwari's wealth and reputation and wants her son to marry his daughter at any cost. Things turn in her favor when Maithili and Raghav get stuck in a riot and are found by their parents in an awkward situation. Soon, Maithili and Raghav's alliance is fixed by the two families.

The show ended on a positive note with Jwala accepting Maithili as her bahu and family reuniting with Maithili and Raghav's union.

Cast

Main
 Simran Pareenja as Maithili Raghav Kumar (née Tiwari): Arun and Sadhna Tiwari's second daughter (adopted), Bhavana and Aarti's sister, Raghav's wife, a woman with extraordinary intelligence 
 Akshit Sukhija as DC Raghav Kumar: Jwala and Mangilal's elder son, Rani, Chanchal and Buchi's brother, Maithili's husband, a hardworking man and a devoted son 
 Ananya Khare as Jwala Devi Kumar:  Mangilal's wife, Raghav, Rani, Chanchal and Buchi's mother, Baksa's elder sister and an extremely greedy and cunning woman who wants to satisfy all her greed using her son Raghav.
Kavita Kaushik as Baksa Mausi: Jwala's younger sister and Raghav,Rani, Chanchal and Buchi's maternal aunt

Recurring
 Amit Behl as Mangilal Kumar: Raghav, Rani, Chanchal and Buchi's father
 Neetu Pachori as Rani: Raghav, Chanchal and Buchi's elder sister, Bhanu's wife 
 Mayank Nishchal as Chanchal Kumar: Raghav, Rani and Buchi's brother
 Smita Sharan as Buchi Kumar: Raghav, Rani and Chanchal's younger sister
 Aashish Kaul as Officer. Arun Tiwari: Sadhna's husband, Maithili, Bhavana and Aarti's father 
 Anindita Chatterjee as Sadhna Tiwari: Maithili, Bhavana and Aarti's mother
 Anushka Merchande as Aarti Tiwari: Arun and Sadhna Tiwari's youngest daughter, Maithili and Bhavana's younger sister  
 Diksha Dhami as Bhavana: Arun and Sadhna Tiwari's eldest daughter, Maithili and Aarti's elder sister
 Jay Vijay Sachan as Reporter: Bhavana's husband 
 Ram Mehar Jangra as Bhanu: Rani's husband
 Munendra Singh Kushwah as Shukla : Raghav's PA

Production

Development
Earlier the show was named as Bahu Kya Laayi Hai, however during the final stages of production it was baptized as Lakshmi Ghar Aayi. The show was finalized by the channel and makers in December 2020 and the filming began in late January 2021 in Film City, Mumbai.

Release
The first promo of the series was shot on 31 January 2021  and was released on 17 March 2021, featuring Simran Pareenja, Akshit Sukhija, Ananya Khare and all the cast representing the Kumar family. The show was supposed to start in the month of April, however, was halted for a period of three months due to COVID-19 pandemic and started broadcasting from 5 July 2021 at 8:00 PM slot of Star Bharat.

Casting
Nimki Mukhiya fame Jatin Suri was initially approached to play Raghav's younger brother Chanchal Kumar and also featured in the show's first promo, but was later replaced by Mayank Nishchal.

References

External links 
 

Indian drama television series
Indian television soap operas
Hindi-language television shows
2021 Indian television series debuts
Star Bharat original programming
Television shows set in Uttarakhand